Dual specificity tyrosine-phosphorylation-regulated kinase 1A is an enzyme that in humans is encoded by the DYRK1A gene. Alternative splicing of this gene generates several transcript variants differing from each other either in the 5' UTR or in the 3' coding region. These variants encode at least five different isoforms.

Function 

DYRK1A is a member of the dual-specificity tyrosine phosphorylation-regulated kinase (DYRK) family. This member contains a nuclear targeting signal sequence, a protein kinase domain, a leucine zipper motif, and a highly conservative 13-consecutive-histidine repeat. It catalyzes its autophosphorylation on serine/threonine and tyrosine residues. It may play a significant role in a signaling pathway regulating cell proliferation and may be involved in brain development.  This gene is a homolog of Drosophila mnb (minibrain) gene.

Dyrk1a has also been shown to modulate plasma homocysteine level in a mouse model of overexpression.

Clinical significance 

DYRK1A is localized in the Down syndrome critical region of chromosome 21, and is considered to be a strong candidate gene for learning defects associated with Down syndrome. In addition, a polymorphism (SNP) in DYRK1A was found to be associated with HIV-1 replication in monocyte-derived macrophages, as well as with slower progression to AIDS in two independent cohorts of HIV-1-infected individuals.  Mutations in DYRK1A are also associated with autism spectrum disorder.

Interactions
DYRK1A has been shown to interact with WDR68.

See also
 DYRK1B
 DYRK2
 DYRK3

References

Further reading

External links